Anna Poliakova (maiden name Anna Zhigalova) is a Russian amateur sumo wrestler. She has won gold medals in both the heavyweight and openweight categories in the 2009, 2013 and 2017 World Games. She has also won seven golds at the Sumo World Championships. In 2018 she was nominated for the World Games Athlete of the Year award.

Biography
She was born in Izhevsk, Udmurt Republic.

She played volleyball from the age of six to twelve, and handball between from thirteen to twenty-one. She is a graduate from Udmurt State University. She has experience working as a swimming instructor in kindergarten. She began Sumo training at September 2003.

Competition
 She won the heavyweight class on 28 October 2012, at the 9th World Sumo Championships in Wan Chai.
 In 2013, she won the heavyweight and openweight divisions of the World Games 2013 Women's Sumo held in Cali, Colombia.
 On 18 and 19 October of the same year, he won the heavyweight and openweight divisions at the 2nd World Combat Games Women's Championship held in St. Petersburg, Russia.
 On 31 August 2014, she won the Openweight class at the 10th World Women's Sumo Championships held in Kaohsiung, Taiwan. 
 On 30 July 2016, she won the 12th World Women's Sumo Championships in Mongolia in the individual open weight class.
 On 22 and 23 July 2017, she won the women's division of the 10th World Games 2017 in Wroclaw, Poland, in the heavyweight and openweight divisions. 
 On 22 July 2018, she won the 13th World Women's Sumo Championships openweight individual competition at the Taoyuan Arena in Taiwan.
 On 13 October 2019, she won the individual heavyweight class at the 14th World Women's Sumo Championships held at Ohama Sumo Stadium in Sakai City, Japan.

References

Living people
Russian sumo wrestlers
Female sumo wrestlers
Competitors at the 2009 World Games
Competitors at the 2013 World Games
Competitors at the 2017 World Games
World Games gold medalists
1981 births
Sportspeople from Izhevsk